So Sad So Sexy is the fourth studio album by Swedish singer Lykke Li, released on 8 June 2018 by RCA. The album was preceded by the release of the singles "Deep End", "Hard Rain", "Utopia", "Sex Money Feelings Die" and "Two Nights" featuring Aminé. Ilsey Juber co-wrote the majority of the album, which is musically influenced by trap. Malay served as an executive producer, with further production by Li's husband Jeff Bhasker, T-Minus, DJ Dahi, Illangelo, Emile Haynie, Jonny Coffer, Kid Harpoon and Rostam Batmanglij, among others.

Release and promotion
Lykke Li announced So Sad So Sexy on 19 April alongside the release of the first two singles from the record, "Deep End" and "Hard Rain". She released the third single "Utopia" on Mother's Day with an intimate video directed by  Clara Cullen. On 29 May, she released two more singles, "Sex Money Feelings Die" and "Two Nights" featuring Aminé. On 10 April, Li shared a trailer for the album featuring a snippet of the title track, which Clash called a "silken pop groove that display[s] Lykke at her effortless best". Under the Radar called the 90-second album trailer "mysterious" and noted Li appearing in different settings wearing various outfits.

Li played various European and North American festivals including the Osheaga Festival in support of the album in mid-2018.

Critical reception

At Metacritic, which assigns a normalised rating out of 100 to reviews from mainstream publications, the album received an average score of 71 based on 23 reviews, indicating "generally favorable reviews". Ilana Kaplan of The Independent wrote, "Li's latest foray in pop is a brilliant display of growth, both personally and professionally. She once again proves that there's no such thing as boring in her music." Consequence of Sounds Grant Sharples said, "Although the trap-influenced style wears thin at times, so sad so sexy is a superb reinvention of Lykke Li." Neil Z. Yeung of AllMusic said, "Li's defeat and grief are palpable, yet she delivers with such grace and control, which offers a glimmer of hope for the fellow romantically downtrodden. With production to match, so sad so sexy succeeds in providing a relatable therapy session for love's final gasps."

In a less positive review, Exclaim! critic Jenna Mohammed said the album "is an unusual blend of pop and R&B inspiration, but it's not a memorable album. Lykke Li scratches the bare surface of the talent she possesses, making you wish there was just a little more energy." Similarly, Claire Biddles of The Line of Best Fit wrote, "The album's repeated motif of smoking and cigarettes as an addiction metaphor feels try-hard rather than smart. The best tracks are those that transpose the drama of Li's best work to the album's more explicitly pop context." Slant Magazines Josh Goller wrote, "So Sad So Sexy is a sleek, homogeneous pop-oriented album that feels both conceptually half-formed and technically fussed-over." For Pitchfork, Stacey Anderson wrote that "with festival-ready hooks and trap-inspired production, Lykke Li delivers another record about an unraveling romance and the fraught sexuality of its final moments with diminishing returns", and that "her traumas are too often muted by abstraction and unspecificity ... it is beginning to lose its impact".

Track listing

Notes
 signifies an additional producer
 signifies a vocal producer
"Hard Rain" features background vocals from Rostam Batmanglij.
"Deep End", "Jaguars in the Air" and "Better Alone" feature background vocals from Ilsey Juber.
"So Sad So Sexy" features background vocals from Andrew Wyatt and Ilsey Juber.

Personnel

 Lykke Li – vocals, executive production
 Aminé – vocals 
 Rostam Batmanglij – production, synthesizer, piano, sampling, drum programming, pitch adjustment, background vocals
 Ali Payami – production, bass, brass band, drums, guitar, keyboards, synthesizer
 Jeff Bhasker – production, guitar, keyboards, piano, Moog synthesizer
 Malay – production, executive production, engineering
 Illangelo – production, mixing
 Skrillex – production, additional production
 Jonny Coffer – production
 DJ Dahi – production
 Emile Haynie – production
 T-Minus – production
 Kid Harpoon – vocal production
 Ilsey Juber – guitar, acoustic guitar, background vocals
 Matt Chamberlain – drums
 Dave Eggar – cello, orchestration, string arrangements, viola
 Brandon Wallace – orchestration, string arrangements
 Scott Desmarais – assistance
 Robin Florent – assistance
 FrancisGotHeat – drum programming
 Ryan Nasci – engineering
 Chris Galland – mixing engineering
 Manny Marroquin – mixing
 Gabe Sackier – remixing
 Dave Kutch – mastering
 Jean-Baptiste – creative direction
 Talbourdet Napoleone – creative direction
 Chloéle Drezen – photography

Charts

References

2018 albums
Lykke Li albums
RCA Records albums
Albums produced by Malay (record producer)
Albums produced by Jeff Bhasker
Albums produced by T-Minus (record producer)
Albums produced by Rostam Batmanglij
Albums produced by DJ Dahi
Albums produced by Emile Haynie
Albums produced by Illangelo